Wanda Rotha (1901–1982) was an Austrian stage actress. She also appeared in some films and television series.

Selected filmography
 Mrs. Fitzherbert (1947)
 Saadia (1953)
 The Mad Bomberg (1957)
 Hamlet (1961)
 The Magnificent Showman  (1964)

References

Bibliography
 Goble, Alan. The Complete Index to Literary Sources in Film. Walter de Gruyter, 1999.

External links

1901 births
1982 deaths
Austrian stage actresses
Austrian television actresses
Austrian film actresses
Actresses from Vienna